{{Infobox poet
| name             = Ida Ospelt-Amann
| birth_place      = Vaduz, Liechtenstein
| death_place      = Vaduz, Liechtenstein
| occupation       = Poet
| language         = Alemannic
| nationality      = 
| birth_date       = 
| death_date       = 
| birth_name       = Ida Amann
| awards           = Golden Cross of Merit
| notable_works    = {{cslist|S'Loob-Bett|S'ischt Suusersunntig}}
| years_active     = 1947–1996
| image            = Ida Ospelt-Amann.jpg
| caption          = Ospelt-Amann in 1989
}}Ida Ospelt-Amann''' (15 February 1899 – 12 March 1996) was a Liechtensteiner poet who wrote in the Alemannic dialect that is spoken in the Vaduz region. She is considered the most important of her country's dialect poets. Her works deal primarily with rural life, as well as with her home town of Vaduz, and its change over time.

 Biography 
Ida Amann was born in February 1899 to Franz Amann and his wife Elisabeth (née Burtscher). From 1905 to 1911 she attended elementary school and from 1911 to 1913 secondary school. After finishing school she went abroad, where she worked in the resorts of Arosa, Portorož and St. Moritz.

Ospelt-Amann wrote her entire corpus of poetry in the Vaduz dialect. Over the years, she gained a certain amount of public notoriety. From 1960 to 1970 she was President of the Vaduz Women's Association. In 1965 she published her first volume of poetry, S'Loob-Bett, which was illustrated by Eugen Verling. This was followed in 1975 by a second book, S'ischt Suusersunntig. She also held readings and appeared on the radio. In 1984, to celebrate her 85th birthday, the book Di aaltaräder was published. In 1991 she issued a cassette tape, featuring texts and poems recorded in the Vaduz dialect. One example of her work is the poem, D Alpfaart, described successful mountaineering. Much of the tone of her writing is nostalgic. In addition to her poetry Ospelt-Amann also collected proverbs and sayings from her dialect for the Liechtenstein National Museum.

Ospelt-Amann died on 12 March 1996. She had a total of six children, two sons and four daughters, including the politicians Hilmar Ospelt (de) and Werner Ospelt. Her grandsons include the artist Mathias Ospelt, and the poet Markus Meier.

 Recognition 
For her services to preserving the Vaduz dialect, she received the Golden Cross of Merit and honorary citizenship from Vaduz.

 Legacy 
According to the Liechtenstein State Library, Ospelt-Amann was a pioneer for the revival of dialect poetry in Liechtenstein. She was an Honorary Member of the Liechtenstein Dialect Foundation.

 Publications 

 1965 S’Loob-Bett 
 1975 S’ischt Suusersunntig 1984 Di aalta Räder (edited collection) Dittmar, Jens, ed. Lyrik aus Liechtenstein: von Heinrich von Frauenberg bis heute''. Liechtenstein, 2005.

References 

1899 births
1996 deaths
Liechtenstein writers
Liechtenstein women writers
Women poets
Alemannic women
People from Vaduz